Riccardo Capogna (born 30 March 1988) is an Italian professional footballer who plays as a forward for  club Pro Sesto.

Club career
He returned to Lecco in the summer of 2018 in Serie D. Following Lecco's promotion to Serie C, on 5 July 2019, he signed a new contract with the club.

On 14 July 2021, he moved to Pro Sesto.

References

External links
 

1988 births
Living people
Footballers from Rome
Italian footballers
Association football forwards
Serie B players
Serie C players
Serie D players
S.S. Lazio players
A.C. Mezzocorona players
A.C. Carpenedolo players
Parma Calcio 1913 players
S.S. Racing Club Fondi players
A.C. Renate players
Aurora Pro Patria 1919 players
S.S. Chieti Calcio players
Calcio Lecco 1912 players
U.S. 1913 Seregno Calcio players
A.C. Gozzano players
S.S.D. Pro Sesto players
Swiss Challenge League players
FC Chiasso players
Italian expatriate footballers
Italian expatriate sportspeople in Switzerland
Expatriate footballers in Switzerland
Italy youth international footballers